"She's So Huge" is a song by American alternative rock band The Flys from their second studio album Holiday Man (1998). It was released as the second single from the album in 1999, by Trauma Records. The song reached a peak of No. 32 on the Billboard Modern Rock Tracks chart on April 17, 1999.

Release
The song was included on the soundtrack to the film Sugar & Spice (2001).

Critical reception
Billboard compared the song to The Romantics and The Smithereens, commenting that the song relies on “structure, pop instinct, and lyrical pith.”

Chart performance
In the United States, the song debuted at number 36 on the Billboard Modern Rock Tracks chart for the issue dated April 3, 1999. It spent a total of five weeks on the chart, peaking at number 32 for the issue dated April 17, 1999.

Credits and personnel
Credits and personnel are adapted from the Holiday Man album liner notes.
Adam Paskowitz – writer, lead vocals
Peter Perdichizzi – writer, guitar, background vocals
James Book – writer, bass, background vocals
Nick Lucero – writer, drums, percussion
Joshua Paskowitz – writer, lead vocals, rhyme
Chris Gross – producer
David Holman – mixing
Paul Palmer - mixing
Martin Schmelzle - recording, engineering
Steve Feldman - additional engineering

Charts

Release history

References

1999 songs
1999 singles
The Flys (American band) songs
Trauma Records singles